B-class submarine may refer to the following

 , a class of eleven submarines launched in 1904–1906 for the British Royal Navy
 The , a class of six Norwegian submarines built from 1922 to 1929
 The , a class of six Spanish submarines launched in 1922–1925
 The , a class of three submarines launched in 1907
 The Japanese Type B submarine, a class of submarine in the Imperial Japanese Navy (IJN) which served during World War II

Submarine classes